Eugene Patrick Emond (January 11, 1921January 28, 1989) was an Officer of the Federal Reserve Bank of New York. During World War II, he was one of the youngest Lieutenants (pilot) of the B-17 Flying Fortress Man O War II, Horsepower Ltd. (see nose art below).

Biography

Early life and education
Eugene Patrick Emond was born to Eugene Edward Emond and Mary McTague in New York City. He was raised in the working-class neighborhood of Washington Heights and attended DeWitt Clinton High School.

Military career
Emond enlisted in the Army during World War II, where he was trained as a B-17 Flying Fortress pilot. After training he was shipped to England to fly in the 91st Bomb Group at RAF Bassingbourn.

During Emond's first combat mission he flew as a tail gunner in the lead group. He flew as the co-pilot of the next few missions and then as pilot (the left seat) for the rest of his tour. Emond finished his tour around the middle of 1944 and was rotated back home to a base in Florida.  When the war ended he elected to stay in the service and was in the Philippines in June 1946. After his allotment of missions, Emond was later offered to become a lead air trainer in Florida.  After a short stint training pilots, he decided to return to his job as a "runner" at the New York Federal Reserve.

Emond completed over 34 missions while leading Man O War II. He received the Distinguished Flying Cross and the Air Medal with 3 Oak leaf clusters and logged 1306 hours at the controls. He is considered one of the youngest Lieutenants to pilot a Fortress.

The book entitled "World War II Album Volume 18: Boeing B-17 Flying Fortress" by Ray Merriam states (used by permission)
"1st Lt. Eugene Emond Lead Pilot for Man O War II Horsepower Limited was part of D-Day and witnessed one of the first German jets when a Me 262 A-1a flow through his formation over Germany.  He was one of the youngest bomber pilots in the US Army Air Forces" (page 24).

Man O War II Horsepower Ltd. B-17G serial number was 42-38083.  Man O War II Horsepower Ltd. of the 322nd Bomber Squadron, 91st Bomb Group flew numerous missions with the 91st before being lost in a mission over Merseburg.

Picture of Emond (third from left standing), pic owned/used by permission by the Emond Family and pic on loan to 91stbombgroup.com
http://www.91stbombgroup.com/crewphotos/man_o_war_2_crew.html

WWII Mission information details.

Date	Destination	 	Duration

5/7/44	Berlin	Germany	        9:20

5/8/44	Berlin	Germany	        8:35

5/9/44	St. Dizier France	6:50

5/12/44	Hale	Germany	        8:50.

5/19/44	Berlin	Germany	        10:15

5/22/44	Kiel	Germany	        7:55

5/24/44	Berlin	Germany	        9:30

5/25/44	Nancy	France	        7:05

5/27/44	Ludwigshaven Germany	7:30

5/28/44	Dessau	Germany	        8:25

6/2/44	D Day Special   	3:45

6/3/44	Coast of France	France	3:45

6/5/44	Coast of France	France	5:30

6/6/44	D Day Special Mission	5:45

6/8/44	France	France	        6:05

6/11/44	Airfield in France	5:00

6/12/44	Airfield in France	5:20

6/13/44	France	France	        5:55

6/15/44	Bordeaux France	        8:20

6/18/44	Hamburg	Germany	        8:40

6/20/44	Hamburg	Germany	        8:35

6/21/44	Berlin	Germany	        9:25

6/22/44	France	France	        5:05

6/23/44	Coast of France	France	4:35

6/24/44	Bridge in France	6:15

6/28/44	France	France	        6:20

7/4/44	Tours 	France	        6:45

7/6/44	Coast of France	France	5:35

7/7/44	Liepsig	Germany	        8:15

7/9/44	Coast of France	France	4:00

7/12/44	Munich	Germany	        9:15

Career
Emond's career at the Federal Reserve Bank of New York spanned 47 years.  The first half of his career was spent as a Bank Examiner traveling throughout New York State. His post Bank Examination positions included being the first Officer in Charge of Operations and Technology, Officer in Charge of the Discount Window, Lead Trainer for Bank Examiners and Senior Officer in Charge of Special Projects. One of the special projects included assisting in the refinancing of the troubled Lockheed Company with investment banks (1970s). Emond was influential in establishing a more formal relationship between the Federal Reserve and the Bank of England.  He was also called upon to manage several special projects for the New York board.

One of the projects included assisting in the refinancing of the troubled Lockheed Air with investment banks.

Marriage, children and grandchildren
Emond married the former Alice Virginia Whalen. The couple had five children together: Eugene Edward, Randall George, Elizabeth Jane, Gary Micheal and Douglas William. After his wife's death in 1972, he raised their two youngest sons on his own.  Grand children of Eugene and Alice are Edward Heinrich, Stacy Heinrich Woodin, Julia Heinrich Sanders, Alice Heinrich Clapsaddle, Allyson Emond Kiss, Christopher Emond, Gregory Emond, Catherine Emond and Patrick Emond.

Death and afterward
Eugene Emond died on January 28, 1989, in Pittsburgh, Pennsylvania.

 Grew up during the depression, and he and his buddies would gather at a funeral parlor (common at that time) called Sheehy's
 Brother-in-law was notable surgeon Dr. William Whalen, would later become President of Saint Vincent's Hospital, NYC, NY
 His brother Lawrence (Larry) become Chief Court Clerk for the New York Supreme Court (Bronx)
 Lifelong Yankee fan
 After his death, family members found a letter addressed to Gene from George Shultz (Secretary of the Treasury) thanking him for his work on the Lockheed "bailout"
 Cathy Minihan (ex-president of the Boston Federal Reserve) worked for Gene at the New York Federal Reserve
 He loved music - especially Opera
 He was a true New Yorker.....

References

Information regarding the verification re: Eugene Emond comes from:
 www.91stbombgroup.com volunteers
 https://web.archive.org/web/20071111164548/http://www.basher82.nl/Data/Opijnen/may42004.htm
 http://www.rootsweb.ancestry.com/~nscpbret/cem20.html  (crew number 1 info)
 interview with Mr. Bernard Crowe (retired patent Lawyer, Union Carbide)
 interview with Mr. Douglas Emond (son)
 interview with Mr. Edward Kipsthul (retired Federal Reserve Officer, New York)
 discharge papers of Eugene P. Emond, World War II 
 Photo of Eugene and crew in front of Man O War II (owned by the Emond Family)
 Microfiche review of actual bomb raids by Man 0 War II, piloted by Eugene Emond - submitted by volunteers of 91st Bomb group
 review of family genealogy - reference made to Dr. William Whalen, Alice Whalen and Lawrence Emond
 Detail daily review of war record 44-322 Dailies of the 91st Bomb Group
 Excerpt from World War II Album Volume 18: Boeing B-17 Flying Fortress By Ray Merriam (used by permission)

1921 births
1989 deaths
People from Washington Heights, Manhattan
Recipients of the Distinguished Flying Cross (United States)
United States Army Air Forces pilots of World War II
United States Army Air Forces officers
Recipients of the Air Medal
DeWitt Clinton High School alumni
Burials at George Washington Memorial Park (Paramus, New Jersey)